The Arabian smooth-hound (Mustelus mosis) is a houndshark of the family Triakidae. It is found on the continental shelves of the tropical western Indian Ocean, from the Red Sea and East Africa to the Maldives, India, and Sri Lanka, between latitudes 30 and 7°N, at depths between 20 and 250 m. It can reach a length of 1.5 m.

References

 

Arabian smooth-hound
Marine fauna of Western Asia
Marine fauna of South Asia
Arabian smooth-hound
Taxa named by Christian Gottfried Ehrenberg
Taxa named by Wilhelm Hemprich